Carnegie Hall Concert is an album by trumpeter Dizzy Gillespie recorded in 1961 at Carnegie Hall, New York City and released on the Verve label.

Track listing
All compositions by Dizzy Gillespie except as indicated
 "Manteca" (Gillespie, Gil Fuller, Chano Pozo) - 6:22  
 "This Is the Way" - 4:00  
 "Ool-Ya-Koo" (Gillespie, Fuller) - 5:35  
 "Kush" - 4:12  
 "Tunisian Fantasy" (Gillespie, Frank Paparelli) - 13:10

Personnel
Dizzy Gillespie - trumpet, vocal
John Frosk, Clark Terry, Carl Warwick, Nick Travis - trumpet
George Matthews, Arnett Sparrow, Britt Woodman, Paul Faulise - trombone
Gunther Schuller, Jimmy Buffington, John Barrows, Richard Berg - French horn
Don Butterfield - tuba 
Leo Wright - alto saxophone, flute
Lalo Schifrin - piano, arranger
Art Davis - bass
Chuck Lampkin - drums
Ray Barretto, Julio Colazo, Jose Mangual - percussion
Joe Carroll - vocal (track 3)

References 

Dizzy Gillespie live albums
1961 live albums
Albums arranged by Lalo Schifrin
Albums produced by Norman Granz
Verve Records live albums
Albums recorded at Carnegie Hall